A lid, also known as a cover, is part of a container, and serves as the closure or seal, usually one that completely closes the object. Lids can be placed on small containers such as tubs as well as larger lids for open-head pails and drums. Some lids have a security strip or a tamper-evident band to hold the lid on securely until opening is desired or authorized. These are usually irreversible to indicate that the container has been opened.

History
Lids have been found on pottery dating back as far as 3100 BC. Ancient Egyptian canopic jars with lids held the organs of mummified bodies as early as 2686 BC. The coffee lid market is valued at roughly $180 million. An estimated 14 billion lids were sold in 2009 in the United States. Some containers such as tubs or jars now have a plastic film heat sealed onto the container: this is often called a lidding film.

Examples

Cultural references
The word is used metaphorically, as in "keeping the lid on the secret" and "flipped his lid". Other meanings or usages include:

 A well-known myth concerns Pandora opening the lid of a box and unleashing terrible evils into the world.
 An old saying that you never have to put a lid on a bucket of crabs (because when one gets near the top, another will inevitably pull it down) is often used as a metaphor for group situations where an individual feels held back by others.

 An old Yiddish saying, that "every pot will find its lid" refers to people finding an appropriate match in marriage.
 The term "lid" is commonly used slang as a synonym for an ounce of herbal cannabis.
 Lids are referred to in the Bible, in the Book of Numbers:

See also 
Closure (container)

References

Sources
 Soroka, W, "Fundamentals of Packaging Technology", IoPP, 2002, 
 Yam, K. L., "Encyclopedia of Packaging Technology", John Wiley & Sons, 2009, 

Seals (mechanical)
Packaging

pt:Tampa